Charlie Paynter (28 July 1879 in Swindon – 1 December 1971) was the manager of West Ham United from 1932 to 1950.
 
He moved to Plaistow with his family as a child. He played for the local teams Victoria Swifts and South West Ham, but while still a teenager he also developed an interest in physiotherapy. Paynter first became involved with West Ham United in 1897 as unpaid help. In the 1900–01 season Paynter joined the club as a player although he never played for the first-team. He sustained a knee injury in a match against Woolwich Arsenal which ended his career and the club appointed him reserve-team trainer in 1902. He was then promoted to first-team trainer, replacing Syd King, who was appointed first team manager.

When King was sacked in 1933, Paynter replaced him. At the time of his appointment the club were near the foot of the Second Division table and in serious danger of a second successive relegation, which was avoided by just one point at the end of the season, with the club finishing 20th, which remains their lowest-ever finish in the league. Their form improved over the seasons that followed, resulting in them finishing third in 1934-35 and only missing out on promotion due to goal average, and finishing fourth the following year. The team's form tailed off in the years ahead, though they still generally finished safely in mid-table. However, his final season in charge, 1949-50 saw another relegation struggle, after which Paynter decided to retire and allow his assistant manager, Ted Fenton to take over.

Managerial statistics

References

1879 births
1971 deaths
Sportspeople from Swindon
English footballers
West Ham United F.C. players
West Ham United F.C. non-playing staff
West Ham United F.C. managers
English Football League managers
English football managers
Association football coaches
Association footballers not categorized by position